Lupiñén-Ortilla is a municipality located in the province of Huesca, Aragon, Spain.

References

Municipalities in the Province of Huesca